Yoshinobu Murase (born 3 March 1957) is a Japanese biathlete. He competed in the 20 km individual event at the 1984 Winter Olympics, finishing in 43rd place.

References

1957 births
Living people
Japanese male biathletes
Olympic biathletes of Japan
Biathletes at the 1984 Winter Olympics
Sportspeople from Hokkaido